Anjo is a given name. As a Portuguese name, it means angel. Notable people with the name include:

 Anjo Buckman (born 1989), German rugby union player
 Anjo Caram (born 1991), Filipino basketball player
 Anjo Damiles (born 1996), Filipino actor and commercial model
Anjo Inacay, musical artist
 Anjo Yllana (born 1968), Filipino actor-comedian, television host and politician
 Yoji Anjo (born 1969), Japanese professional wrestler and mixed martial artist